Oued Mellah (in Arabic language oued means river and mellah means salty) is a seasonal creek in coastal Morocco. Oued Mellah is 160 km long and has an average flow of 1.46 m3/s. It takes sources north of Khouribga at an elevation of 760 m and empties in the Atlantic Ocean in the city of Mohammedia. There are two dams over Oued Mellah; the first was built during the French Protectorate to provide water to Casablanca. A newer dam, named Tamesna, was built upstream near the city of Ben Ahmed.

References

www.water.gov.ma

Rivers of Morocco